Red Top, Red-top or Redtop may refer to

Agrostis gigantea - known as "Black Bent" or "redtop grass"
Red tops, a collective term for some United Kingdom tabloid newspapers
Hawker Siddeley Red Top, an air-to-air missile
Red top tubes, used to collect samples of blood serum 
Red Top (Dallas County), Missouri, United States
Red Top (Webster County), Missouri, United States
Red Top Mountain State Park in Georgia, United States
Redtop Mountain, Canada
Harvard's training facility for the Harvard–Yale Regatta
Redtop (Belmont, Massachusetts), William Dean Howells' house
Red Top Young, Robert Young, a musician
Red top milk - in the UK, skimmed milk with a fat content of between 0.1 and 0.3%
"Red tops" - in the UK, tabloid newspapers such as The Sun, the Daily Star, the Daily Mirror, and the Daily Record known for their red mastheads
"Red Top", a song recorded by Don Patterson on the album Four Dimensions
C20LET - a 2.0L Turbo engine produced by Vauxhall/Opel in the 1990s, named after the red valve cover